Junior Anthony Wright Jr. (born August 12, 1986) is an American professional boxer who challenged for the WBA cruiserweight title in 2016. As an amateur, he was a three-time Chicago Golden Gloves champion and also fought in the National Golden Gloves tournament.

Early life 
Wright was born in Evanston, Illinois, on the northern outskirts of Chicago, where he currently resides and trains. At age 16, he was introduced to boxing when he played the video game Knockout Kings, and joined a boxing gym in Chicago shortly thereafter.

Amateur career 
In 2008, at age 21, Wright made his amateur boxing debut. As an amateur, he trained out of the Evanston Boxing Club and won the Chicago Golden Gloves boxing tournament three times; twice at middleweight and once as a light heavyweight. He also competed in the 2008 National Golden Gloves tournament, losing to Denis Douglin three rounds to two, who ultimately won the tournament.

Professional career 
On October 7, 2011, at age 25, Wright made his professional debut in Burbank, Illinois in a cruiserweight bout in which he defeated Darrion Fletcher by first-round knockout (KO). He went on to win his next nine fights (seven at cruiserweight and two at heavyweight) to accumulate a professional record of 10–0 (9 KOs), earning him a chance at the vacant WBC International cruiserweight title against Stivens Bujaj on May 15, 2014. In the ten-round fight, held at the Millennium Theater in Brighton Beach, Brooklyn, New York, Wright fought to a split draw with the judges' scorecards reading 96–94, 95–95, and 94–96. Following his fight against Bujaj, Wright signed with Dmitry Salita's Star of David Promotions.

In 2014, Wright joined the training camp of world champion Adonis Stevenson to assist him in his preparation for his WBC light heavyweight title defense against Dmitry Sukhotsky, which Stevenson went on to win via fifth-round KO.

Wright won his next three fights (two at cruiserweight and one at heavyweight) to improve his professional record to 13–0–1. He dedicated one of these fights, his technical knockout (TKO) victory over Rayford Johnson, to a pair of NYPD officers who were shot and killed in the month leading up to the fight. his 2015 fight for the vacant IBO cruiserweight title, in which he suffered his first professional defeat to Rakhim Chakhkiev.

On May 21, 2016, after winning his next two cruiserweight fights, Wright fought Beibut Shumenov for the WBA cruiserweight title in Las Vegas. Shumenov defeated Wright via tenth-round TKO. After the Shumenov fight, Wright moved up to the heavyweight division – fighting only more time as a cruiserweight in a unanimous decision (UD) loss to undefeated Ruslan Fayer in 2017. Since the Shumenov fight, Wright has won all three of his heavyweight fights by TKO or KO to improve to a professional record of 18–3–1.

Rick Wilson and Steve Clemente have both trained Wright during his professional boxing career.

Personal life 
Starting at age 11, Wright worked for his father's landscaping company. As an amateur boxer, Wright balanced his training with working approximately 65 hours per week at Home Depot while also helping with his father's business. He continued to work at Home Depot through much of his professional boxing career. He briefly enrolled in community college, but dropped out in order to earn money.

References

External links 
 

Living people
1986 births
African-American boxers
American male boxers
Heavyweight boxers
Cruiserweight boxers
Boxers from Chicago